Faarlund is a Norwegian surname. Notable people with the surname include:

Jan Terje Faarlund (born 1943), Norwegian linguist
Nils Petter Faarlund (born 1937), Norwegian mountaineer

Norwegian-language surnames